Iraota timoleon, the silverstreak blue, is a species of lycaenid or blue butterfly found in Asia.

Description

Subspecies
Iraota timoleon arsaces (Fruhstorfer, 1907) (south India - Madhya Pradesh to Kerala)
Iraota timoleon timoleon (Stoll, 1790) (Andaman & Nicobar Island, Odisha, Uttarakhand to North-East India, South China)
Iraota timoleon nicevillei (Butler, 1901) (Sri Lanka)
Iraota timoleon wickii (Eliot, 1980) (Malaysia)

Life history

References

Amblypodiini
Butterflies described in 1790
Butterflies of Asia